Washington Township is a township in Butler County, Pennsylvania, United States.  The population was 1,300 at the 2010 census.

Geography
Washington Township is located in northeastern Butler County and contains the unincorporated communities of Hilliards, Argentine, Annisville, Whiskerville, Parsonville, and North Washington. Slippery Rock Creek rises in the northern part of the township.

Demographics

As of the census of 2000, there were 1,419 people, 511 households, and 396 families living in the township.  The population density was 56.7 people per square mile (21.9/km2).  There were 560 housing units at an average density of 22.4/sq mi (8.6/km2).  The racial makeup of the township was 98.8% White, 0.1% African American, 0.6% Native American, 0.2% Asian, 0.1% from other races, and 0.2% from two or more races.

There were 511 households, out of which 37.2% had children under the age of 18 living with them, 64.0% were married couples living together, 10.0% had a female householder with no husband present, and 22.5% were non-families. 18.0% of all households were made up of individuals, and 7.0% had someone living alone who was 65 years of age or older.  The average household size was 2.78 and the average family size was 3.15.

In the township the population was spread out, with 28.4% under the age of 18, 6.4% from 18 to 24, 31.1% from 25 to 44, 22.1% from 45 to 64, and 11.9% who were 65 years of age or older.  The median age was 36 years. For every 100 females there were 94.1 males.  For every 100 females age 18 and over, there were 98.1 males.

The median income for a household in the township was $31,645, and the median income for a family was $35,563. Males had a median income of $30,966 versus $24,250 for females. The per capita income for the township was $13,464.  About 13.6% of families and 16.5% of the population were below the poverty line, including 18.3% of those under age 18 and 13.5% of those age 65 or over.

References

Populated places established in 1796
Townships in Butler County, Pennsylvania
1846 establishments in Pennsylvania